Made in Scotland is a 3-part documentary series produced by STV Studios and broadcast on STV in Northern and Central Scotland in 2009, presented by Taggart actor John Michie. The show has since been broadcast across the UK on digital channel Blighty.

Michie, as well as a number of well-known faces from Scotland, focus on an iconic symbol that makes Scotland so unique and recognisable internationally.

Exploring the country, its people and its culture, this series has seen celebrities examining Scottish icons that many Scots take for granted, while revealing little known history and also challenging popular assumptions.

The programme was made by STV, in association with the Daily Record and Sunday Mail, to celebrate Homecoming Scotland 2009.

10-minute clips of the programme are used as fillers on STV.

Presenters

References

External links

2000s Scottish television series
2009 Scottish television series debuts
2009 Scottish television series endings
Television series by STV Studios